An intermittent mechanism or intermittent movement is a device or movement which regularly advances an object, web, or plastic film and then holds it in place. This process is commonly used in industry and manufacturing.  

This motion is critical to the use of  film in a movie camera or movie projector. This is in contrast to a continuous mechanism, whereby the film is constantly in motion and the image is held steady by optical or electronic methods. The reason the intermittent mechanism "works" for the viewer is because of a phenomenon called persistence of vision.

History
Intermittent mechanisms were first used in sewing machines, in order for the fabric to be fed through correctly - ensuring it is stationary as each stitch is made, while moving the required distance between stitches.

Methods used

The intermittent mechanism must be employed in concert with a rotating shutter which blocks light transmittance during the motion of the film and allows light through while the film is held in place usually by one or more registration pins. The intermittent mechanism can be accomplished in many ways, but most often, it is done with sprocket wheels, claws, or pins coupled to the camera or projector drive mechanism. 

In movie theater projectors, the intermittent movement is often produced by a Geneva drive (Maltese cross mechanism).

However, in a movie camera, it is done through a process by which a shutter opens exposing the film negative to light for a split second, then the shutter closes blocking light from reaching the negative. Once the shutter is completely closed, a claw pulls down the next film frame of negative film by the sprocket holes into the film gate and the process begins again. A movie projector works in a similar way.

The standard exposure period for regular motion in North America is 1/48 of a second, which corresponds to 180 degrees, but shutters with 200 degrees were popular back when the then-available color negative film had an ASA of 50; today's color negative film is available with an ASA of 500.

See also
Dwell mechanism
Fast motion
Slow motion

References

External links
 Examples of camera movements

Mechanical synchronization